Leukothea (minor planet designation: 35 Leukothea) is a large, dark asteroid from the asteroid belt. It was discovered by German astronomer Karl Theodor Robert Luther on April 19, 1855, and named after Leukothea, a sea goddess in Greek mythology. 35 Leukothea is a C-type asteroid in the Tholen classification system, suggesting a carbonaceous composition.

This is consistent with previous studies in 1990 and 2008.

The computed Lyapunov time for this asteroid is 20,000 years, indicating that it occupies a chaotic orbit that will change randomly over time because of gravitational perturbations of the planets.

References

External links
 
 

C-type asteroids (Tholen)
C-type asteroids (SMASS)
Background asteroids
Leukothea
Leukothea
18550419